The Smolensk Ring  is a circuit in western Russia near the town of Safonovo in the settlement of Verkhnedneprovsky. The construction of the  circuit started in 2007, and the inaugural international event was a round of the FIA European Truck Racing Championship in August 2010.

The Smolensk Ring was initially supposed to host rounds of the FIA GT3 European Championship in 2011, however this was later postponed to 2012 because the track didn't complete in time modifications required to garner the necessary FIA track license.

History

The race track, with the prerequisite modifications in place, will fulfill the International Automobile Federation (FIA) requirements for a Grade 2 race track, and the first category according to the classification of the Russian Automobile Federation (RAF). With the FIA Grade 2 license, the Smolensk Ring will be able to host motor racing for all classes except Formula One. But it was lastly graded by Grade 4 until 24 May 2020.

Russian Touring Car Championship driver Yuri Semenchev was killed in an accident at the circuit in August 2012.

Action sports
August 2010 — 5 stage FIA European Truck Racing Championship (Truck Battle Russia 2010)
22 May 2011 — 1 stage RTCC (Russian Touring Car Championship)
30–31 July 2011 — 6 stageFIA European Truck Racing Championship (Truck Battle Russia 2011)
9 October 2011 — 7 stage RTCC (Russian Touring Car Championship)

Lap records
The official race lap records at the Smolensk Ring are listed as:

References

External links
Circuit website

Motorsport venues in Russia
Buildings and structures in Smolensk Oblast
Sport in Smolensk Oblast
Racing circuits designed by Hermann Tilke
Sports venues completed in 2010
2010 establishments in Russia